This is the timeline of notable early Estonian publications, along with links to the articles discussing them.

Estonian
Estonian literature
Mass media in Estonia